Constituent Assembly elections were held in Algeria on 28 September 1962, the first legislative elections since independence in July. The Assembly was to have a one-year mandate to draw up and promulgate a constitution. A single list of 196 National Liberation Front candidates was put to voters to approve, 180 of which were Arabs and 16 of which were of European origin. A reported 99.6% voted in favour, with a turnout of 83.8%. 

The constitution was approved in a referendum in September 1963, and the mandate of the Assembly was extended by a year in accordance with article 77. However, President Ahmed Ben Bella froze the Assembly's activities and assumed full powers on 3 October 1963.

Results

References

Algeria
Constituent Assembly election
Elections in Algeria
Single-candidate elections
One-party elections
Algerian Constituent Assembly election